Adem Mekić (born December 28, 1995) is a Macedonian professional basketball player currently plays for Zadar.

References

External links
 Adem Mekić Profile at realgm.com
 Adem Mekić Profile at aba-liga.com

1995 births
Living people
ABA League players
KK MZT Skopje players
Macedonian men's basketball players
Point guards
Sportspeople from Skopje